Matthew Thomas Walker (born September 16, 1992) is an American professional soccer player who plays as a midfielder.

Career

Early career
Walker played four years of college soccer at Xavier University between 2010 and 2013. He also appeared for USL PDL side Michigan Bucks during their 2013 season.

Columbus Crew
Walker signed as a Homegrown Player with Columbus Crew on January 8, 2014. He was loaned out to their USL Pro affiliate Dayton Dutch Lions in March 2014.

References

1992 births
Living people
American soccer players
Soccer players from Cincinnati
Association football midfielders
USL League Two players
USL Championship players
Xavier Musketeers men's soccer players
Flint City Bucks players
Columbus Crew players
Dayton Dutch Lions players
Homegrown Players (MLS)